Texas Barbecue refers to methods of preparation for barbecue unique to Texan cuisine. Beef brisket, pork ribs, and sausage are among the most commonly known dishes. The term can also include side dishes that are traditionally served alongside the smoked meats.

History

Native Americans had been slow cooking meat before European settlement.  people began this tradition of barbecue in North America before the 1500s, long before Central Europeans arrived in central Texas. European meat-smoking traditions were brought to Central Texas by German and Czech settlers during the mid-19th century. Traditionally, butchers would smoke the leftover meat that had not been sold, allowing it to be stored longer without spoiling. "As these leftovers became popular among the migrants in the area, multiple meat markets began to specialize in smoked meats".

According to Daniel Vaughn, barbecue editor at Texas Monthly, Southside Market & Barbeque is the oldest barbecue joint in Texas still in operation. The restaurant opened in 1886.

In 1964, President Lyndon B. Johnson hosted a state dinner featuring barbecue for the Mexican president-elect in Johnson City, Texas. This was the first barbecue state dinner in the history of the United States.

In 2019, J. C. Reid of the Houston Chronicle wrote that pulled pork barbecue was becoming common in Texas despite having originated in a different region.

Styles and variations 
Texas barbecue traditions differ Geographically and culturally: East Texas, Central Texas, South Texas, and West Texas each have their own unique barbecue styles. Of these various styles, the Central and East Texas varieties are considered to be the most well-known.

The different kinds of Texas barbecue can be distinguished as follows:

East Texas style—the meat is slowly cooked to the point that it is "falling off the bone." It is typically cooked over hickory wood and marinated in a sweet, tomato-based sauce.
Central Texas style—the meat is typically rubbed with only salt and black pepper (though some restaurants have been known to use other spices), then cooked over indirect heat from pecan, post oak, or mesquite wood. Sauce is typically considered unnecessary, but it may be served on the side to complement the meat.
West Texas style—the meat is cooked over direct heat from mesquite wood in a method very similar to grilling.
South Texas style—the meat is marinated in thick, molasses-like sauces that keep the meat moist after cooking.

Another style of barbecue, barbacoa, is characteristic of South Texas and the Rio Grande valley near the Mexico–United States border. 

Barbacoa is a traditional Mexican form of barbecue that typically uses goat, lamb, or sheep meat, although beef is also sometimes used. In its most authentic form, barbacoa is prepared in a hole dug in the ground and covered in maguey (Agave americana) leaves.

East Texas
East Texas barbecue is usually chopped rather than sliced. It may be made of either beef or pork. It is usually served on a bun.

In "Texas Barbecue in Black and White," Robb Walsh writes that African-American varieties of barbecue in East Texas favored beef rather than pork due to its prevalence in the region. Walsh quotes an artist, Bert Long, who states that African-American varieties are heavily smoked.

According to Reid, the presence of pork ribs in East Texas barbecue originated from elsewhere in the South. According to Walsh, the origins date back to when barbecues were held for slaves. Many Black restaurant owners, in 1910, struggled as food-safety regulations passed throughout Texas restricted the operation of their restaurants. Later on, the widespread implementation of a new innovation, the cinder block pit, allowed Black restaurateurs to serve their fellow Black customers.

In a 1973 Texas Monthly article, Griffin Smith, Jr. describes East Texas barbecue as an "extension" of barbecue served in the Southern United States and says that beef and pork appear equally in the cuisine. According to Smith, the style's emphasis on sauces and spices originated from a time when African-Americans received poor-quality cuts of meat that needed flavoring. According to Smith, the "finest manifestations" of this style were found in African-American-operated restaurants. Smith further describes East Texas barbecue as "...a chopped pork sandwich with hot sauce..."

Central Texas
The Central Texas pit-style barbecue was established in the 19th century along the Chisholm Trail in the towns of Lockhart, Luling, and Taylor.  European immigrants, who owned meat-packing plants, opened retail meat markets serving cooked meats wrapped in red butcher paper, a tradition that persists in many Central Texas towns. This barbecue style's popularity has spread considerably around the world, especially to Southern California, New York City, Britain, and Australia.

At a typical Central Texas pit-style barbecue restaurant, customers take a cafeteria-style tray and are served by a butcher who carves the meat by weight. Barbecue meats are commonly sold by the pound. 

Next, side dishes and desserts including slices of white bread, crinkle-cut dill pickle chips, sliced onion, jalapeño, and corn bread are picked up along the line. 

This style of barbecue emphasizes the meat, so if sauce is available, it is usually considered a side to dip into. Calvin Trillin, writing in The New Yorker, said that discussions of Central Texas pit barbecue do not concern the piquancy of the sauces or common side dishes and desserts—the main consideration is the quality of the cooking of the meats.

Smith argues that the lack of focus on sauces is due to the fact that noon meat markets were once dominated by upper-class purchasers who could choose from the highest quality cuts of meat and had little interest in sauces. 

He also states that many sauces in Central Texas pit barbecue are intentionally made "bland" in comparison to the flavor of the meats themselves. The sauce is typically thinner and unsweetened, as opposed to the Kansas City and Memphis styles, which rely heavily on molasses, sugar, and corn syrup to provide thickness and sweetness.

In 2010, Jayne Clark of USA Today described the "Texas Barbecue Trail", an East-of-Austin "semi-loop" including Elgin, Lockhart, Luling, and Taylor. Barbecue eateries in this semi-loop, such as Louie Mueller Barbecue, are within an hour from Austin running from northeast to the southeast.

Other styles
West Texas barbecue, sometimes called "cowboy style," traditionally uses a more direct heating method than other styles. Food is generally cooked over mesquite, granting it a distinct, smoky flavor that is different from other wood-smoked styles.

Barbecue in the border area between the South Texas Plains and Northern Mexico is mostly influenced by Mexican cuisine. Historically, this area was the birthplace of the Texas ranching tradition. Often, Mexican farmhands were partially paid for their work with less-desirable cuts of meat, such as the diaphragm and the cow's head. It is the cow's head that defines South Texas barbecue (called barbacoa). The head would be wrapped in wet maguey leaves and buried in a pit with hot coals for several hours, after which the meat would be pulled off for barbacoa tacos. The tongue would also be used to make lengua tacos. Today, this barbecue is mostly cooked in an oven in a bain-marie.

See also

 Barbecue in the United States

References

American cuisine
Barbecue
Texan cuisine